Kimpton is an extinct town in Cass County, in the U.S. state of Missouri.

Kimpton was platted in 1891, and named after a local merchant.  A post office called Kimpton was established in 1889, and remained in operation until 1902.

References

Ghost towns in Missouri
Former populated places in Cass County, Missouri